Mesopsocus fuscifrons is a species of Psocoptera from the Mesopsocidae family that can be found in North Macedonia and Kaliningrad, Russia.

References

Mesopsocidae
Insects described in 1966
Psocoptera of Europe